Greenfield Valley Heritage Park is a  country park in the United Kingdom. It is located near the town of Holywell, in Wales. It is well known for its woodland, reservoirs, ancient monuments (including the ruins of Basingwerk Abbey), rich industrial past and its factories which played a big part in the Industrial Revolution.

Factories 
A majority of the factories were built in the late 18th century. They were powered by Water Power which came from the Holywell Stream. Most factories had eventually closed down by the 1960s. Some factory buildings can still be seen today.

Battery Factory 
The Battery Works employed local people to shape pots and pans from brass sheets, the energy needed to do this was made by using a Water Wheel, the water came from the Battery Pond.

Next to the Battery Factory is the ruins of Battery Row, were many of the employees would have lived.

The Battery Factory now lies next to the Battery Pond in ruin, the site is now supported by the 'National Welsh Heritage Lottery Fund'.

Meadow Mill 
The Meadow Mill built in 1787 produced rolled copper sheets for Thomas Williams's companies.

Lower Cotton Mill 
One of many cotton mills that flourished throughout the valley. The factory still stands to this day, tourists are not allowed to enter the building.

Remains of machinery that was used can be viewed as it lies outside of the factory.

Abbey Wire Mill 
Copper and brass wire was made. Most of the factory has been destroyed and only a few features from the ruins are visible.

Basingwerk Abbey 

The park is home to the ruins of Basingwerk Abbey.

Old school 

Near the Visitor centre there is an old village school which was originally built near the town of Holywell, but was reconstructed in to the valley. Today, the school is used by visitors, in sessions developed by the museum volunteers, that can show visitors what school life was like in the Victorian times.

Visitor centre 

The visitor centre is the entrance to a farm and museum. The center also provides information on woodland walks, educational activities, bird watching and fishing in the area.

Near the ruins of Basingwerk Abbey is a farm and museum which visitors can enter for a small fee. The farm consists of reconstructed local buildings, animals and activities for the children.

References 
 Greenfield Valley Heritage Park Holywell Dyffryn Maes Glas

External links
Greenfield Valley Heritage Park - official site

Museums in Flintshire
Open-air museums in Wales
Country parks in Wales
Industry museums in Wales
Farm museums in the United Kingdom
Organisations based in Flintshire
Parks in Flintshire